Elections to Colchester Borough Council took place on 5 May 2016. Colchester Borough Council normally elects one third of its councillors each year, however, due to boundary changes, the whole council is up for election.

Prior to this election, the cabinet (8 seats) was held by a coalition including the Liberal Democrats (5 seats), the Labour Party (2 seats) and a Highwoods & Stanway Independent (1 seat). Paul Smith (Liberal Democrat), a councillor from St. John's ward, was elected Leader of the Council by 32 to 28 votes.

Each voter had three available votes instead of the usual one vote.

Background

Following the 2015 election the Liberal Democrat-Labour-Independent coalition maintained control of the Council, although with a much reduced majority (14 to 4). The Liberal Democrats suffered heavy losses in North and West Colchester with 4 councillors being unseated, all by the Conservative Party. The Conservatives subsequently became the largest party on the Council but short of a majority by 4 councillors.

Although failing to win additional seats, the Labour Party made moderate gains in vote share across the Borough. Following a promising performance at the 2014 election, the UK Independence Party failed to build on their success and lost in vote share across Colchester, failing to take a single ward. Like UKIP, and despite a notable boost in local and national membership, the Green Party of England and Wales also fell in vote share and failed to win any seats. However, both UKIP and the Green Party received the highest number of votes for their respective parties in a Colchester local election.

Prior to the election, Independent member for Stanway, Laura Sykes, resigned her post as Borough Councillor due to moving away from the area. This left the ruling coalition with a majority of 3 over the Conservative group.

Boundary Changes 

A boundary review was undertaken throughout 2014/2015 as part of a review of local authority electoral wards. The new electoral wards have taken effect from this election reducing the number of councillors by 9 (from 60 to 51), reducing the number of wards by 10 (from 27 to 17) and standardising the number of councillors representing each ward (3 councillors per ward). Each ward is designed to contain approximately 8,000 electors, taking into account the projected population growth over the next 10 years.

Summary

Candidates by party

Results

The total number of seats on the council was reduced from 60 to 51 seats, resulting in a nominal loss of 5 Conservative and 4 Liberal Democrats councillors. This is reflected in the changes in seats.

Council Composition

Prior to the election the composition of the council was:

After the election, the composition of the council was:

Ward Results

Due to boundary changes the number of wards was reduced from 27 to 17. Each ward is represented by 3 councillors. The length of an elected councillor's term will depend on the position of election within that ward (1st, 4 years; 2nd, 3 years; 3rd, 2 years). Terms will revert to 4-years as standard from the 2018 election.

The Statement of Nominated Persons was released by Colchester Borough Council's Returning Officer following the closing of nominations on 7 April 2016. This detailed the list of candidates nominated to stand in each ward.

The percentages shown in the tables are calculated by dividing the votes a candidate received by the total turnout, then multiplying by one-hundred.

Incumbent councillors are marked with an asterisk*

Berechurch

Castle

Greenstead

Greenstead was created from the following wards:

 St. Andrew's
 St. Anne's

Highwoods

Lexden & Braiswick

Lexden & Braiswick was created from the following wards:

 Lexden
 West Bergholt & Eight Ash Green
 Mile End
 Great Tey

Marks Tey & Layer

Marks Tey & Layer was created from the following wards:

 Marks Tey
 Birch & Winstree
 Copford & West Stanway

Mersea & Pyefleet

Mersea & Pyefleet was created from the following wards:

 West Mersea
 Pyefleet

Mile End

New Town & Christ Church

New Town & Christ Church was created from the following wards:

 New Town
 Christ Church

Old Heath & The Hythe

Old Heath & The Hythe was created from the following wards:

 Old Heath
 New Town
 East Donyland

Prettygate

Rural North

Rural North was created from the following wards:

 Dedham & Langham
 Fordham & Stour
 Great Tey
 West Bergholt & Eight Ash Green

Shrub End

St. Anne's & St. John's

St. Anne's & St. John's was created from the following wards:

 St. Anne's
 St. John's

Stanway

Tiptree

Wivenhoe

Wivenhoe was created from the following wards:

 Wivenhoe Cross
 Wivenhoe Quay

By-elections

Shrub End

A by-election was called in Shrub End following the resignation of Cllr Karen Chaplin (Liberal Democrat). The seat was gained by the Conservatives in the subsequent by-election.

References

2016
2016 English local elections
2010s in Essex